Johanna Edwards (born February 27, 1978) is a bestselling American novelist and award-winning entertainment journalist.  Her books have been translated into various languages, and are sold all over the world.

Biography 
Born in Memphis, Tennessee, Edwards graduated magna cum laude from the University of Memphis with a degree in journalism in 2001.

Edwards is best known for her chick-lit novel, The Next Big Thing, which was published in 2005 and remained on the national bestseller list for nearly three months.  Her follow-up novel, Your Big Break, was also a bestseller.  Her third novel, How to Be Cool, was published by Penguin in June 2008.  Edwards has also written two teen-lit novels, the first of which, Love Undercover, was published by Simon & Schuster in late 2006, and her second young adult novel, Go Figure, was released October 2007.

Edwards has been featured in a variety of publications, including USA Today, Us Weekly, The Boston Globe, and Writer's Digest.  She currently resides in Memphis.

Awards and honors 
In 2001, she received a Hearst Award for her work in journalism. In 2008, she was given the Distinguished Young Alumni Award from the University of Memphis; and in 2012, the Center for Research on Women at the University of Memphis honored her as one of 100 Women who have made a difference in the past 100 years.

Bibliography
 How to Be Cool (2007)
 Your Big Break (2006)
 The Next Big Thing (2005)

Young adult books written under the pen name Jo Edwards:
 Go Figure (2007)
 Love Undercover  (2006)

External links
 http://www.johannaedwards.com/

1978 births
Living people
21st-century American novelists
American young adult novelists
University of Memphis alumni
American chick lit writers
American women novelists
21st-century American women writers
Women writers of young adult literature